Chrysanthemum pacificum, commonly called gold and silver chrysanthemum, is a species of flowering plant in the aster family. It is native to Japan, where it is endemic to the island of Honshu. Its natural habitat is along the Pacific coast, where it often grows on ocean cliffs.

Description 
It is a showy plant, blooming in late fall and producing yellow heads of flowers. It was introduced into U.S. gardening catalogs in 1989, and has been in cultivation in Japan since an early date.

References

pacificum
Flora of Japan
Endemic flora of Japan
Taxa named by Takenoshin Nakai